Eller is a German and Estonian surname. It is the surname of the following people:
 Allen Eller (1976–2016), American soccer player
 Are Eller (born 1947), Estonian sports journalist and rower
 August Eller (1907–1990), Estonian chess player
 Carl Eller (born 1942), American football player 
 Cássia Eller (1962–2001), Brazilian musician
 Curtis Eller (born 1970), American banjo player and musician
 Ernest M. Eller (1903–1995), Rear Admiral in the United States Navy
 Fabiano Eller (born 1977), Brazilian footballer
 Hans Eller (1910–1943), German rower
 Heino Eller (1887–1970), Estonian composer
 Hillar Eller (1939–2010), Estonian politician
 Hod Eller (1891–1961), American baseball pitcher
 Johann Theodor Eller (1689–1760), Prussian physician chemist
 John Jacob Eller (1883–1967), American track and field athlete
 Kalle Eller (born 1940), Estonian poet, publisher, neopagan and writer
 Karl Eller (born 1928), American entrepreneur in Arizona
 Lars Eller (born 1989), Danish ice hockey player
 Marlin Eller, American programmer
 Thomas Eller (born 1964), German artist and writer
 Vernard Eller (1927–2007), American Christian author
 Walton Eller (born 1982), American trap shooter

Estonian-language surnames
German-language surnames